Fernando Adames Torres was born around the 3rd decade of the 19th century in Siquisique, a small city near Barquisimeto on Lara State in the country of Venezuela. He was the son of Juan Bautista Adames and Magdalena Torres. During his early years prior to entering the Military, Fernando Adames spent most of his time as a business entrepreneur, until March 1858 where he joined the military during the Revolution of 1858 serving under the orders of Mariscal Falcon. This revolution lasted five years and ended with the formation of the "Federacion Venezolana".

Military positions and honors
During his time in the military, General Fernando Adames held many high positions in the government including "Jefe de Estado Mayor del Ejército Venezolano", a very high position in the military. In this role, he served directly under Mariscal Falcon, who was the highest ranked officer during the time. Later in his official military career, General Fernando Adames was named as President of the State of Barquisimeto, a position which he did not accept. Later he was twice Commander and Chief of the Venezuelan Military, and he served as Senator representing his native state in the Venezuelan House of Congress.

General Fernando Adames Torres received several letters of commendation for valor and leadership from President Antonio Guzman Blanco for maintaining peace in the territories governed by General Adames.

Important family members
General Fernando Adames Torres was married to Dolores Garcia, and they had a son they named Belarmino Adames Garcia, who also became a General in the Venezuelan military.
General Belarmino Adames Garcia married Laura Santi, the daughter of Admiral Jose Minos Santi, also a member of the Venezuelan military.
General Fernando Adames Torres was the grand son of General Pedro Leon Torres (see link below in the references for additional information on General Torres).

Additional pictures

Letters written by President Antonio Guzman Blanco to General Fernando Adames

Author
Mauricio Adames Posada..(Great, Great Grand Son of General Fernando Adames Torres)

See also 
Venezuela
Venezuelan government
List of Venezuelans

References
Venezuelan historian Telasco Macpherson has written many articles identifying and describing different battles and the most important military figures. One such article talks about General Fernando Adames Torres involvement in the revolution of Coro. 
http://www.municipiourdaneta.com/general_fernando_adames.php
Pedro Leon Torres was a General in the Venezuelan Military in the early 1800s who served during the Hispanic/American Independence war. Pedro Leon Torres is General Fernando Adames grand father.
 :es:Pedro Leon Torres

1837 births
1910 deaths
Venezuelan military personnel
Venezuelan politicians
Venezuelan businesspeople